The following is a list of those born in Britain or of British citizenship who have worked in the classical music tradition.

A

Richard Addinsell (1904–1977)
John Addison (1765–1844)
Thomas Adès (born 1971)
Kenneth J. Alford (1881–1945)
William Alwyn (1905–1965)
Geoffrey Alvarez (born 1961)
Julian Anderson (born 1967)
Kerry Andrew (born 1978)
Denis ApIvor (1916–2004)
Malcolm Archer (born 1952)
Thomas Arne (1710–1778)
Richard Arnell (1917–2009)
Malcolm Arnold (1921–2006)
Algernon Ashton (1859-1937)
Ivor Atkins (1869–1963)
Frederic Austin (1872–1952)
Charles Avison (1709–1770)

B

C

D

E

F

G

H

I
John Ireland (1879–1962)

J

K

L

M

N

O

P

Q
Roger Quilter (1877–1953)

R

S

T

V

W

See also
Chronological list of English classical composers

British
Composers

Classical composers